Daisy Lang (born on 4 April 1972) is a former professional boxer who competed from 1996 to 2004. She is a former three division world champion and was the first Bulgarian woman to capture a world title, having held the WIBF super-flyweight, bantamweight, and super-bantamweight titles between 1999 to 2004.

Early life
As a child, Lang was involved in athletics and had great data on sprints in the 200 and 400 meters, but gave up the sport after she was forced, along with her teammates, to wait in sub-zero temperatures for her coach, who at times would not show up for training. She was attracted to sports and therefore practiced Judo, but a few years later she was attracted to Taekwondo. Before her boxing career, Lang competed as a martial artist. She is a black belt and a European champion in Taekwondo. She also was World Champion in karate 1995 in the U.S., European champion and World Champion in kickboxing.

Daisy Lang earned physical therapy degrees at the National Sport Academy in Sofia, Bulgaria and continued her education at the German Sport University, Cologne.

Boxing career
Lang began boxing professionally in February 1996 in Germany. She lived in Dusseldorf and trained in Hamburg, where Universum Box-Promotion was based, she won her first three fights of her career in 1996, two of them by knockout. On 29 November 1997 Daisy lost  against Michele Aboro in the six rounds fight. In February 1998, Daisy Lang won the vacant WIBF European Bantamweight title in ten rounds against Krisztina Horvai.

After winning another fight by knockout in round 2, she defended her European championship belt against Anastasia Toktaulova on 27 March 1999. On 17 July of the same year, Lang became world champion  with a victory against Gizella Papp in the battle for the vacant WIBF Super Flyweight title.

From 1999 to 2002 Daisy Lang successfully defended her title against Sonia Pereira, Kathy Williams, Oana Jurma, Brenda Burnside, Nadia Debras, Michelle Sutcliffe and Réka Krempf. On 14 September 2002 she won against Lisa Foster in a fight for the GBU world Bantamweight championship in ten rounds. On 18 January 2003 Lang drew against Silke Weickenmeier in fight for the GBU Super banthamweight title, but won the rematch on 10 May with a majority decision in ten rounds. On 15 November 2003 she lost against Galina Ivanova in ten rounds, in a fight for the WIBF Super Flyweight title.

In 2004, she won an 8-round match against Marian Pampuk of Hungary, but in her next match on 29 May 2004 she lost against Regina Halmich in a fight for the vacant IWBF Super Flyweight title, in ten rounds by unanimous decision. In October 2004 she won another fight by knockout Simone Suchiu in the third round.

Awards
2016 Lifetime achievement award from the US Martial Arts Hall of Fame: "Hall of Heroes".
The International Women's Boxing Hall of Fame USA (IWBHF) 2017 inductee.
Hall of Honors Achievements in Martial Arts&Women Pro Boxing on 04.27.2018 and 2019, Munich.Germany. 
AMAA Martial Arts Ambassador of the year on 06.28.2019, Las Vegas, NV.
Master Hall of Fame Inductee on 07.27.2019,Costa Mesa,CA.

Professional boxing record

Filmography

References

1972 births
Living people
Bulgarian women boxers
Bulgarian female kickboxers
Bulgarian female karateka
Sportspeople from Sofia
Bulgarian expatriate sportspeople in Germany
Super-flyweight boxers
Bantamweight boxers
Super-bantamweight boxers